Eryngium mathiasiae is a species of flowering plant in the family Apiaceae known by the common name Mathias' eryngo, or Mathias' button celery.

The plant was named for American botanist Mildred Esther Mathias of California.

It is endemic to the Modoc Plateau of northeastern California, where it grows in the vernal pools of the local river drainages, and other wet areas such as ditches.

Description
Eryngium mathiasiae is an erect perennial herb 30 to 40 centimeters tall. There is a basal rosette of long lance-shaped leaves, the blades up to 17 centimeters long and lined with sharp-pointed serrations or lobes, borne on petioles several centimeters in length.

The inflorescence is an array of flower heads, each surrounded by sharp, spined bracts. The greenish flower heads bloom in small, white petals.

References

External links
Jepson Manual Treatment
USDA Plants Profile
Photo gallery

mathiasiae
Endemic flora of California
Flora of the Great Basin
Modoc Plateau
~
Flora without expected TNC conservation status